Movement is an album by Jamaican saxophonist Joe Harriott recorded in England in 1963 and released on the Columbia (UK) label.

Reception
All About Jazz writer, Duncan Heining, stated "Movement is perhaps the best representation of a typical Joe Harriott Quintet gig of the period, combining as it does straight-ahead tracks with his free-form work".

Track listing
All compositions by Joe Harriott except as indicated
 "Morning Blue" - 4:43   
 "Beams" - 5:15   
 "Count Twelve" - 3:29   
 "Face in the Crowd" (Michael Garrick) - 5:14   
 "Revival" - 3:11   
 "Blues On Blues" (Garrick) - 4:53   
 "Spaces" - 6:28   
 "Spiritual Blues" - 3:40   
 "Movement "- 4:33

Personnel 

Joe Harriott - alto saxophone
Shake Keane - trumpet, flugelhorn 
Pat Smythe - piano
Coleridge Goode - bass
Bobby Orr - drums

References 

Columbia Records albums
Joe Harriott albums
1963 albums